Charax was a fortress town of Perrhaebia in ancient Thessaly, on the left bank of the Peneus, at the entrance of the Vale of Tempe.

References

Populated places in ancient Thessaly
Former populated places in Greece
Perrhaebia
Lost ancient cities and towns